P. Miles Bryson was born in August 1964, and is a collage and sound artist residing in Arizona.  He has released music on a variety of music labels such as Illegal Art, Self Abuse, genesungswerk, SSSM, Cynfeirdd, Anaemic Waves Factory, and 6 on the dot. Releases include Long Day's Tango Into Night and Alejandro's Carniceria.

References

External links 
 

1964 births
Living people
Musicians from Arizona
Sound collage artists